The Berlin Crisis of 1961 occurred between 4 June – 9 November 1961, and was the last major European politico-military incident of the Cold War about the occupational status of the German capital city, Berlin, and of post–World War II Germany. The Berlin Crisis started when the USSR issued an ultimatum demanding the withdrawal of all armed forces from Berlin, including the Western armed forces in West Berlin. The crisis culminated in the city's de facto partition with the East German construction of the Berlin Wall.

History

1961 Berlin ultimatum
At the Vienna summit on 4 June 1961, tensions rose. Meeting with US President John F. Kennedy, Soviet Premier Nikita Khrushchev reissued the Soviet ultimatum to sign a separate peace treaty with East Germany and thus end the existing four-power agreements guaranteeing American, British, and French rights to access West Berlin and the occupation of East Berlin by Soviet forces. However, this time he did so by issuing a deadline of 31 December 1961. The three powers responded that any unilateral treaty could not affect their responsibilities and rights in West Berlin.

Rising tensions
In the growing confrontation over the status of Berlin, Kennedy undercut his own bargaining position during his Vienna summit negotiations with Khrushchev in June 1961. Kennedy essentially conveyed US acquiescence to the permanent division of Berlin. This made his later, more assertive public statements less credible to the Soviets. Kennedy decided on a flexible policy proposed by his younger advisors, with only a few concessions to the hardliners around Dean Acheson. The United States now defined three vital interests in its policy for Berlin, and linked all of them only to the western part of the city: the presence of Western troops in West Berlin; the security and viability of the western sectors; and Western access to them.

As the confrontation over Berlin escalated, Kennedy delivered on July 25 a television speech in Washington on CBS, and broadcast nationwide in the US. He reiterated that the United States was not looking for a fight and that he recognized the "Soviet Union's historical concerns about their security in central and eastern Europe." He said he was willing to renew talks, but he also announced that he would ask Congress for an additional $3.25 billion for military spending, mostly on conventional weapons. He wanted six new divisions for the Army and two for the Marines, and he announced plans to triple the draft and to call up the reserves. Kennedy proclaimed: "We seek peace, but we shall not surrender."

Vacationing in the Black Sea resort of Sochi, Khrushchev was reported to be angered by Kennedy's speech. John Jay McCloy, Kennedy's disarmament adviser, who happened to be in the Soviet Union, was invited to join Khrushchev. It is reported that Khrushchev explained to McCloy that Kennedy's military build-up threatened war.

Plans for the Berlin Wall

In early 1961, the East German government sought a way to stop its population leaving for the West. Walter Ulbricht, First Secretary of the Socialist Unity Party (SED) and Staatsrat chairman and thus East Germany's chief decision-maker, convinced the Soviet Union that force was necessary to stop this movement, although Berlin's four-power status required the allowance of free travel between zones and forbade the presence of German troops in Berlin.

The East German government began stockpiling building materials for the erection of the Berlin Wall; this activity was widely known, but only a small circle of Soviet and East German planners believed that East Germans were aware of the purpose. This material included enough barbed wire to enclose the 156 km (97 mi) circumference of West Berlin. The regime managed to avoid suspicion by spreading out the purchases of barbed wire among several East German companies, which in turn spread their orders out among a range of firms in West Germany and the United Kingdom.

On 15 June 1961, two months before the construction of the Berlin Wall started, Walter Ulbricht stated in an international press conference: "Niemand hat die Absicht, eine Mauer zu errichten!" ("No one has the intention to erect a wall"). It was the first time the term Mauer (wall) had been used in this context.

On 4–7 August 1961, the foreign ministers of the US, UK, France and West Germany secretly met in Paris to discuss how to respond to the Soviet actions in West Berlin. They expressed a lack of willingness to engage in warfare. Within weeks, the KGB provided Khrushchev with descriptions of the Paris talks. These showed that US Secretary of State Dean Rusk, unlike the West Germans, supported talks with the Soviet Union, though the KGB and the GRU warned that the US was being pressured by other members of the alliance to consider economic sanctions against East Germany and other socialist countries and to move faster on plans for conventional and nuclear armament of their allies in Western Europe, such as the West German Bundeswehr.

The West had advance intelligence about the construction of the Wall. On 6 August, a human intelligence source, a functionary in the SED, provided the 513th Military Intelligence Group (Berlin) with the correct date of the start of construction. At a weekly meeting of the Berlin Watch Committee on 9 August 1961, the Chief of the US Military Liaison Mission to the Commander Group of Soviet Forces Germany predicted the construction of a wall. An intercept of SED communications on the same day informed the West that there were plans to begin blocking all foot traffic between East and West Berlin. The interagency intelligence Watch Committee assessment said that this intercept "might be the first step in a plan to close the border", which turned out to be correct.

Closing of the border
On Saturday 12 August 1961, the leaders of East Germany attended a garden party at a government guesthouse in Döllnsee, in a wooded area to the north of East Berlin, and Walter Ulbricht signed the order to close the border and erect a Wall around West Berlin.

At midnight, East Germany's border police, the East German army and units of the Soviet Army began to close the border; by morning on Sunday 13 August 1961, the border to West Berlin had been shut. Approximately 32,000 troops were employed for the building of the Wall, after which the Border Police became responsible for manning and improving it. To discourage Western interference and perhaps control potential riots, the Soviet Army was present.

Kennedy did not give in to angry demands for immediate action raised by West Berliners and their mayor, Willy Brandt. Instead, he sent vice president Lyndon B. Johnson together with Lucius D. Clay, the hero of the Berlin Airlift of 1948‒49, to West Berlin on August 19. They managed to calm the population and demonstrate symbolically the United States' solidarity with the city. On August 20, 1,500 additional American soldiers arrived in West Berlin.

On 30 August 1961, in response to moves by the Soviet Union to cut off access to Berlin, President Kennedy ordered 148,000 Guardsmen and Reservists to active duty. In October and November, more Air National Guard units were mobilised, and 216 aircraft from the tactical fighter units flew to Europe in operation "Stair Step", the largest jet deployment in the history of the Air Guard. Most of the mobilised Air Guardsmen remained in the US, while some others had been trained for delivery of tactical nuclear weapons and had to be retrained in Europe for conventional operations. The Air National Guard's ageing F-84s and F-86s required spare parts that the United States Air Forces in Europe lacked.

Richard Bach wrote his book Stranger to the Ground centred around his experience as an Air National Guard pilot on this deployment.

Berlin travel disputes

The four powers governing Berlin (Soviet Union, United States, United Kingdom, and France) had agreed at the 1945 Potsdam Conference that Allied personnel could move freely in any sector of Berlin.  But on 22 October 1961, just two months after the construction of the Wall, the US Chief of Mission in West Berlin, E. Allan Lightner, was stopped in his car (which had occupation forces license plates) while crossing at Checkpoint Charlie to go to a theatre in East Berlin.  President John F. Kennedy worked closely with retired Army General Lucius D. Clay, who had been in charge of the Berlin Airlift of 1948–1949. They decided to demonstrate American resolve. The American command in the West Berlin garrison considered a plan to pull down the wire and barricades with bulldozers. This, however, was overruled by the troop commander, Brigadier General Frederick O. Hartel. General Clay went to Berlin for 10 months.

Military stand-off
US Commandant General Watson was outraged by the East Berlin police's attempt to control the passage of American military forces. He communicated to the Department of State on 25 October 1961 that Soviet Commandant Colonel Solovyev and his men were not doing their part to avoid disturbing actions during a time of peace negotiations, and demanded that the Soviet authorities take immediate steps to remedy the situation. Solovyev replied by describing American attempts to send armed soldiers across the checkpoint and keeping American tanks at sector boundary as an "open provocation" and a direct violation of GDR regulations. He insisted that properly identified American military could cross the sector border without impediments, and were only stopped when their nationality was not immediately clear to guards. Solovyev contended that requesting identifying paperwork from those crossing the border was not unreasonable control; Watson disagreed. In regard to the American military presence on the border, Solovyev warned:I am authorized to state that it is necessary to avoid actions of this kind. Such actions can provoke corresponding actions from our side. We have tanks too. We hate the idea of carrying out such actions, and are sure that you will re-examine your course.Perhaps this contributed to Hemsing's decision to make the attempt again: on 27 October 1961, Hemsing again approached the zonal boundary in a diplomatic vehicle.  But General Clay did not know how the Soviets would respond, and sent tanks with an infantry battalion to the nearby Tempelhof airfield. No conflict took place, and the military police and tanks were recalled without incident.

Immediately afterwards, 33 Soviet tanks drove to the Brandenburg Gate. Curiously, Soviet premier Nikita Khrushchev claimed in his memoirs that as he understood it, the American tanks had seen the Soviet tanks coming and retreated. Col. Jim Atwood, then Commander of the US Military Mission in West Berlin, disagreed in later statements. As one of the first to spot the tanks when they arrived, Lieutenant Vern Pike was ordered to verify whether they were indeed Soviet tanks.  He and tank driver Sam McCart drove over to East Berlin, where Pike took advantage of a temporary absence of any soldiers near the tanks to climb into one of them.  He came out with definitive evidence that the tanks were Soviet, including a Red Army newspaper.

Ten of these tanks continued to Friedrichstraße, and stopped just 50 to 100 metres from the checkpoint on the Soviet side of the sector boundary.  The US tanks turned back towards the checkpoint, stopping an equal distance from it on the American side of the boundary. From 27 October 1961 at 17:00 until 28 October 1961 at about 11:00, the respective troops faced each other.  As per standing orders, both groups of tanks were loaded with live munitions. The alert levels of the US Garrison in West Berlin, then NATO, and finally the US Strategic Air Command (SAC) were raised.

It was at this point that US Secretary of State Dean Rusk conveyed to General Lucius Clay, the US commanding officer in Berlin, that "We had long since decided that Berlin is not a vital interest which would warrant determined recourse to force to protect and sustain." Clay was convinced that having US tanks use bulldozer mounts to knock down parts of the Wall would have ended the crisis to the greater advantage of the US and its allies without eliciting a Soviet military response. Frederick Kempe argues that Rusk's views support a more unfavorable assessment of Kennedy's decisions during the crisis and his willingness to accept the Wall as the best solution.

The United States deployed the Davy Crockett tactical nuclear recoilless gun during the Berlin crisis of 1961, according to Brigadier General Alvin Cowan, Assistant Division Commander of the United States 3rd Armored Division, at the Tactical Nuclear Weapons Symposium of 1969. According to Cowan, the device was [eventually] retired, in part, because "it was essentially a platoon weapon," and there was apparently "great fear that some sergeant would start a nuclear war." President Kennedy had voiced concern, to include when he inspected the Crockett during his June 1963 visit to Fleigerhorst Kaserne, Hanau, about US infantrymen having frontline nuclear weapons, reassurances that the D/C squads did not include Mental Cat 4 GIs notwithstanding.  Also, SEC DEF MacNamara wanted to rush 171 Crocketts to USAREUR in December 1971  [from page 224 of Marc Trachtenberg's book, HISTORY & STRATEGY (Princeton University Press, 1991)].

Resolution
With GRU spy Georgi Bolshakov serving as the primary channel of communication, Khrushchev and Kennedy agreed to reduce tensions by withdrawing the tanks. The Soviet checkpoint had direct communications to General Anatoly Gribkov at the Soviet Army High Command, who in turn was on the phone to Khrushchev. The US checkpoint contained a Military Police officer on the telephone to the HQ of the US Military Mission in Berlin, which in turn was in communication with the White House. Kennedy offered to go easy over Berlin in the future in return for the Soviets removing their tanks first. The Soviets agreed. Kennedy stated concerning the Wall: "It's not a very nice solution, but a wall is a hell of a lot better than a war."

A Soviet tank moved about 5 metres backwards first; then an American tank followed suit.  One by one the tanks withdrew.  But General Bruce C. Clarke, then the Commander-in-Chief (CINC) of US Army Europe (USAREUR), was said to have been concerned about General Clay's conduct and Clay returned to the United States in May 1962.  Gen. Clarke's assessment may have been incomplete, however: Clay's firmness had a great effect on the German population, led by West Berlin Mayor Willy Brandt and West German Chancellor Konrad Adenauer.

See also
 Berlin Crisis of 1958–1959
 Escape attempts and victims of the inner German border
 Flight and expulsion of Germans (1944–1950)
Republikflucht Flight from East Germany
 History of Berlin
 Nikita Khrushchev
 Presidency of Dwight D. Eisenhower
 Presidency of John F. Kennedy

Notes

Further reading
 Barker, Elisabeth. “The Berlin Crisis 1958–1962.” International Affairs 39#1 (1963), pp. 59–73. online. 
 Beschloss, Michael. The Crisis Years: Kennedy and Khrushchev, 1960–1963 (1991) online
 Carmichael, Neil. "A Brief History of the Berlin Crisis of 1961" (US National Archives,. 2011); short essay;; not copyright
 
 

 Freedman, Lawrence. Kennedy's Wars: Berlin, Cuba, Laos, and Vietnam (Oxford UP, 2000) pp 45–120. online
 Gearson, John PS, and Kori N. Schake, eds. The Berlin Wall Crisis: Perspectives on Cold War Alliances (Palgrave Macmillan, 2002).

 Lunak, Petr. "Khrushchev and the Berlin Crisis: Soviet brinkmanship seen from inside." Cold War History 3.2 (2003): 53–82.

 Newman, Kitty. Macmillan, Khrushchev and the Berlin Crisis, 1958-1960 (Routledge, 2007).

 Rasmussen, Kasper Grotle. "In search of a negotiated settlement: McGeorge Bundy and the 1961 Berlin crisis." Journal of Transatlantic Studies 14.1 (2016): 47–64.
 Schick, Jack M. The Berlin crisis, 1958-1962 (1971) online
 Sergunin, Alexander. "The role of the Executive Office of the President in the US decision-making on the Berlin crisis of 1961." Americana 15 (2017): 64–95.
 Slusser, Robert M. The Berlin Crisis of 1961: Soviet-American Relations and the Struggle for Power in the Kremlin, June–November, 1961 (Johns Hopkins UP, 1973) excerpt
 Smith, Jean Edward. The defense of Berlin (1963).
 Taubman, William. Khrushchev: The Man and his Era (WW Norton & Company, 2003). pp 480–506.online
 
 Tompson, William. Khrushchev: A political life (Springer, 2016). online

 Trachtenberg, Marc. A Constructed Peace: The Making of the European Settlement 1945‒1963 (Princeton UP, 1999) pp. 283–402. excerpt
 Voorhees, Theodore. The Silent Guns of Two Octobers: Kennedy and Khrushchev Play the Double Game (U of Michigan Press, 2020).

 Windsor, Philip. "The Berlin Crises" History Today (June 1962) Vol. 6, p375-384, summarizes the series of crises 1946 to 1961; online.

 Zubok, Vladislav. "Khrushchev and the Berlin Crisis (1958‒1962)" (CWIHP, 1993) online, primary sources

External links
The Wall, 1958–1963 
Forty Years Crisis
First strike options and the Berlin Crisis
Khrushchev's Secret Speech on the Berlin Crisis, August 1961
Conference: "From Vienna to Checkpoint Charlie: The Berlin Crisis of 1961"
 

Cold War history of Germany
Crisis of 1961
Inner German border
Battles and conflicts without fatalities
Foreign relations of the Soviet Union
Germany–Soviet Union relations
Germany–United States relations
Soviet Union–United States relations
East Germany–Soviet Union relations
East Germany–West Germany relations
United States–West Germany relations
1961 in international relations
1961 in East Germany
1961 in military history
1961 in politics
Combat incidents
Cold War history of the Soviet Union
Diplomatic incidents
Crisis of 1961